Darren Lehto (born May 17, 1968) is a Canadian-American curler from Athabasca, Alberta.

He won the 2013 United States Men's Curling Championship, earning the chance to compete at the 2013 World Men's Championship in Victoria, British Columbia. They finished ninth at World's.

At the national level Lehto has also won the  2005 United States Mixed Curling Championship and the 2020 United States Senior Curling Championship. The latter means he will again play on the world level, representing the United States at the 2020 World Senior Curling Championships in Kelowna, British Columbia in April, 2020.

Teams

Men's

Mixed

Personal life
Darren Lehto started curling in 1984 at the age of 16.

He moved from Canada to the United States in 1996 and became an American citizen in 1998.

He is employed as regional sales manager with RedBuilt.

References

External links

Living people
1968 births
Curlers from Alberta
People from Athabasca, Alberta
American male curlers
American curling champions
Canadian emigrants to the United States